Xiyang County is a county in the east of Shanxi province, China, bordering Shanxi province to the east. It is the easternmost county-level division of the prefecture-level city of Jinzhong.

Climate

See also
 Chen Yonggui
 Dazhai

References

www.xzqh.org 

 
County-level divisions of Shanxi
Jinzhong